Indian Beach is an unincorporated community in Sussex County, Delaware, United States. Indian Beach is located on the Atlantic Ocean and Delaware Route 1, south of Dewey Beach.

References 

Beaches of Delaware
Unincorporated communities in Sussex County, Delaware
Unincorporated communities in Delaware